Primary pulmonary coccidioidomycosis is an infection caused by inhalation of Coccidioides immitis.  Once pulmonary symptoms subside, about 30% of women and 15% of men will have allergic skin manifestations in the form of erythema nodosum. A coccidioidoma is a benign localized residual granulomatous lesion or scar that can remain in the lung's tissues following primary pulmonary coccidioidomycosis.

See also 
 Coccidioidomycosis
 List of cutaneous conditions

References 

Mycosis-related cutaneous conditions